The 2015 UCI Europe Tour was the eleventh season of the UCI Europe Tour. The 2015 season began on 29 January 2015 with the Trofeo Santanyí-Ses Salines-Campos and ended on 25 October 2015 with the Tour of Aegean.

The points leader, based on the cumulative results of previous races, wears the UCI Europe Tour cycling jersey. Tom Van Asbroeck of Belgium is the defending champion of the 2014 UCI Europe Tour.

Throughout the season, points are awarded to the top finishers of stages within stage races and the final general classification standings of each of the stages races and one-day events. The quality and complexity of a race also determines how many points are awarded to the top finishers, the higher the UCI rating of a race, the more points are awarded.

The UCI ratings from highest to lowest are as follows:
 Multi-day events: 2.HC, 2.1 and 2.2
 One-day events: 1.HC, 1.1 and 1.2

Events

January

February

March

April

May

June

July

August

September

October

Final standings

References

External links
 

 
UCI Europe Tour
2015 UCI Europe Tour
UCI